Alone in the World is a painting created by nineteenth-century French artist William-Adolphe Bouguereau. Although the exact year of creation is unknown, Theo van Gogh acquired it in 1867 so it may be placed in the early part of Bouguereau's career.

The painting depicts a peasant girl holding a violin and standing on a bridge over the Seine in Paris.  She is looking to her left with a melancholy expression.  The cathedral of Notre Dame can be seen in the background, as well as a bridge which appears to be the Pont Royal.  This indicates that the girl is standing on the Pont de Solférino.

See also
 William-Adolphe Bouguereau gallery

References

External links
William-Adolphe Bouguereau at the Web Museum

Paintings by William-Adolphe Bouguereau
1860s paintings
Musical instruments in art